The Northern Territories was an electronic music project from Sweden. It was started in Uppsala in 1992 by John Alexander Ericson (vocals, instruments and electronics) and Stefan Sääf (vocals and electronics). Musically this group centred on synthpop, their first two releases came on German label Machinery Records. Later their music became more guitar influenced. John Alexander Ericson started a solo career after their disbanding.

Discography

External links 
 The Northern Territories (Official site)
 John Alexander Ericson (Official site)

Swedish musical groups